El-Mannan Mohsin Atta (born 1948) is a Sudanese footballer. He competed in the men's tournament at the 1972 Summer Olympics.

References

External links
 

1948 births
Living people
Sudanese footballers
Sudan international footballers
Olympic footballers of Sudan
Footballers at the 1972 Summer Olympics
Place of birth missing (living people)
Association football forwards